

Bargate stone is a highly durable form of sandstone. It owes its yellow, butter or honey colouring to a high iron content. In some contexts it may be considered to be a form of ironstone. However, in the context of stone buildings local to the extraction of Bargate Stone, the term 'ironstone' is often used to refer to a darker stone, also extracted from the Greensand, which rusts to a brown colour.

Sources
This stone was quarried for centuries in the Bargate Member of the Greensand Ridge, particularly where it is widest in south west Surrey, England.  It occurs near the surface and was quarried in the hillsides near Godalming.  Medieval quarries are still visible in Godalming, at the foot of Holloway Hill.

Bargate stone is rare in current use due to its short supply.  Bath stone, Yorkstone and other similar coloured stone is sometimes used as alternatives, or to complement it.

Petrography
Bargate stone is typically a mix of sandy bioclastic limestone and bioclastic standstone. The intergranular cements comprise ferroan carbonate.

Use
Bargate Stone is found in many buildings in Surrey, approximately 250 of which are listed, and in two churches in London. It is endemic to older buildings near the Greensand Ridge where it is found.
Its 20th century use tended towards coursed use of Bargate sandstone with bricks, or concrete, sometimes with ashlar dressings or mortar rendering.

Examples

Early medieval

The Keep at Guildford Castle. It was a credit to the strength of Bargate that it was chosen for the main structure, standing on top of the natural chalk and Bargate stone bedrock, made it available by quarrying in the locality. 
Godalming Parish Church, Grade I listed assisted by Saxon features.  
Church of St. Mary and All Saints, Dunsfold
St Nicholas's Church Compton, Guildford (Bargate rubble used, mortar-rendered)
Church of St. Mary the Virgin (12th century tower only), Oxted in Tandridge District, east Surrey
St Mary's Church, (relevantly mostly in clunch from its own Quarry Street) Guildford
St James's Church, Abinger
All Saints Church, Witley, Surrey

16th Century
Tillingbourne Cottage, Wotton, Surrey

17th Century
Cosford Mill, Thursley

18th Century

Leith Hill Tower

19th Century
St Catherine's School/Drama Studio, Guildford
St Stephen's Church, Gloucester Road, London (York stone parpoints and dressings in Bath stone)
St Nicholas's Church, Guildford
St Michael's Church, York Town, Camberley
The Shah Jahan Mosque, completed in 1889 along with similar-coloured Bath stone, but a limestone not a sandstone
Charterhouse School (completed 1872)
St Stephen's Church, Rochester Row, Westminster
Munstead Wood
Chinthurst Hill
Grafham Grange School, Bramley
St James' Court, Farnham
St Johns Church, Caterham

20th Century
The Pergola, Vann Park and Garden, Hambledon
Pinewoods, Oxshott
Tigbourne Court, Wormley (blocks with thin horizontal bands of tiles)
Hascombe Court, Hascombe
Platform of war memorial, Bramshott, Hampshire
St Tarcisius Church, Camberley — the War Memorial Church to the British Catholic army officers who died in World War I.  North Lady Chapel has triple arches and a stone reredos depicting the Virgin and Child and angels Bath stone dressings
Orchards by Edwin Lutyens and Gertrude Jekyll, Bramley

See also
 Reigate Stone quarried from the Upper Greensand Formation in east Surrey

Notes and references
Notes 
  
References

Sandstone in the United Kingdom
Building stone